Ukrainskiy may refer to:
Ukrainian people
Ukrainian language
Ukrainskiye Otruba, Azerbaijan